Hodíškov is a municipality and village in Žďár nad Sázavou District in the Vysočina Region of the Czech Republic. It has about 200 inhabitants.

Geography
It lies in the Křižanov Highlands. The territory is rich in ponds. The most notable of them is Hodíškovský, protected together with its immediate surroundings as a nature monument.

History
The first written mention of Hodíškov is from 1417. In the 15th century, Hodíškov was owned by the Konáč family. As of 1653, Hodíškov consisted of eight farms. The village was part of the Žďár estate until 1850 when it gained independence. From 1813 to 1945, the Linsbauer family was the most prominent family in Hodíškov.

Sights
The Chapel of Saints Cyril and Methodius was built in 1874–1877.

References

External links

Villages in Žďár nad Sázavou District